WinDVD (owned by Corel Corporation which bought InterVideo in 2006) is a commercial video player and music player software for Microsoft Windows. It enables the viewing of DVD-Video movies on the user's PC. DVD-Video backups stored on hard disk (created using software such as DVD Decrypter) can also be played. The player also can be used to play video and audio files in other formats encoded with different codecs, such as DivX, Xvid, Windows Media Video (video), MP3 and AAC (audio). WinDVD Pro 12 is the latest version with the most features and accommodations.

Features and Functions
Features and functions supported by InterVideo WinDVD version 8.0 during video/movie and audio/music playback.
Supported video formats/codecs: MPEG-1, MPEG-2 (including HD support), MPEG-TS, DVD-Video, MiniDVD, MPEG-4 ASP (like Xvid and DivX, including DivX Pro), H.264/MPEG-4 AVC, VC-1, WMV HD, DVD-VR, DVD+VR, 3GPP and 3GPP2, QuickTime, RealMedia/RealVideo
Supported audio formats/codecs: WAV, MP3, AAC, LPCM, MLP Lossless, Dolby Digital (5.1) and Dolby Digital (2.0), Dolby Digital EX, DTS 2.0 and 5.1, DTS Neo:6, DTS 96/24, DTS-ES Discrete, RealMedia/RealAudio

Video Playback
 TrimensionDNM  interpolates frames to give smooth playback
 Smooth Reverse Playback  smooth reverse/rewind playback without dropping frames
 Video Desktop  display subpanel to let the movie play in the background, just like a Windows wallpaper
 Software Video Deinterlacing  ensures a smoother and clearer video image on progressive displays
 Dynamic range compression and SRS  offers modes suited to Quiet, Noisy and Normal listening environments
 Instant Replay  Jump back to the line you missed, or catch that action sequence again
 "Boss Key"  One click hides the player out of the way from the desktop
 9X Digital Zoom
 Closed captioning support provides closed captioning for the deaf and hard of hearing
 Video Bookmarks enable quick access to a user's favorite movie scenes
Saved as a file with ".bmk" extension for later use or export for use on another computer
 Resume playback   allows users to play a DVD from the last scene prior to stopping
 Screen snapshots can be captured with a user-defined aspect ratio
 External subtitle support allows playback via AVI, DivX and WMV files
Supports SRT, SUB, SSA, ASS, PSB, SMI extensions and XSUB (DivX embedded subtitles)
Allows you to adjust the placement, subtitle color and size of subtitles
 On-screen display (OSD) lets users define where video information is located
 Color Themes lets users personalize the look of your player to match their mood or their desktop
 Low Frequency Effects (LFE) mixes the LFE channel (bass) with front speaker channels
 Dolby Pro Logic IIx  2.0 - 5.1 => 7.1 audio-channels expansion technology (upsample anything from 2.0 to 7.1 surround sound)
 Dolby Headphone  Virtual surround sound on 2-channel (stereo) headphones

Music Playback
 Dynamic range compression and SRS  offers modes that boost bass tones of your music

General Features

 Playlist playback and creation support  for audio or video files from DVDs, VCDs, SVCDs and CDs
 "Movie Encyclopedia" is a feature of WinDVD that enables users to access a movie database for details on movies, actors and directors, (similar to IMDb).
 UPnP Control Point (UPnP-client)  Play videos from any UPnP AV MediaServer device in your home network
 UPnP UPnP AV MediaServer (UPnP-server)  allows other UPnP Control Point devices in your home network to stream audio/video files from WinDVD

See also
Comparison of video player software
LinDVD
WinDVD Recorder

References

External links
WinDVD at Corel

1998 software
Software Blu-ray players
Software DVD players
Windows media players